The Prinzessinnenpalais (English: Princesses' Palace) is a former Royal Prussian residence on Unter den Linden boulevard in the historic centre of Berlin. It was built in 1733 according to plans by Friedrich Wilhelm Diterichs in Rococo style and extended from 1810 to 1811 by Heinrich Gentz in Neoclassical style. Damaged during the Allied bombing in World War II, the Prinzessinnenpalais was rebuilt from 1963 to 1964 by Richard Paulick as part of the Forum Fridericianum. Since 2018, it has been home to an art collection of Deutsche Bank.

See also
 Kronprinzenpalais

References

Bibliography
 Folkwin Wendland. "Berlins Gärten und Parke von der Gründung der Stadt bis zum ausgehenden neunzehnten Jahrhundert: Das klassische Berlin". Propyläen Verlag (1979). pp. 55-57 (in German)

External links
PalaisPopulaire

Houses completed in 1730
Buildings and structures in Mitte
Palaces in Berlin
Royal residences in Berlin
Prussian cultural sites
Rebuilt buildings and structures in Berlin